Charles Lumsden (July 23, 1932 – May 31, 2014) was a Canadian football player who played for the Winnipeg Blue Bombers. He previously played for the Winnipeg Light Infantry. He also played ice hockey.

References

External links

1932 births
2014 deaths
Canadian football guards
Ice hockey people from Manitoba
Winnipeg Blue Bombers players
Toronto Marlboros players
Pittsburgh Hornets players
Winnipeg Warriors (minor pro) players
Winnipeg Maroons players
Players of Canadian football from Manitoba
Canadian ice hockey defencemen
Canadian football people from Winnipeg